Andrea Kimi Antonelli (born 25 August 2006) is an Italian racing driver currently set to race in the 2023 Formula Regional European Championship with Prema Racing.  He won the 2023 Formula Regional Middle East Championship with Mumbai Falcons and has previously competed in the Italian F4 Championship and ADAC Formula 4 Championship for Prema Racing, which he won in both series. He has been part of the Mercedes Junior Team since 2019.

Career

Karting 
Antonelli started in karting at the age of seven and has been successful in a number of categories in the discipline. He has won the Easykart International Grand Final (Easy 60), South Garda Winter Cup, WSK Champions Cup, WSK Super Master Series, WSK Euro Series, and was crowned CIK-FIA Karting European Champion twice in a row in 2020 and 2021.

Formula 4

Italian F4 Championship

2021 

In 2021, just three weeks after he turned 15, Antonelli made his single-seater debut in the fifth round of the 2021 Italian F4 Championship, driving for Prema at the Red Bull Ring. He got his campaign off to a good start, finishing as the best rookie in his first race and scoring four points across the weekend. The Italian scored points again at the following round in Mugello, but his breakout weekend would be the final event at the Monza Circuit. Antonelli got second place in race one after a hard battle with championship leader Ollie Bearman and scored two third places to cap off the weekend. Overall, Antonelli ended up tenth in the standings despite missing the majority of the season, being just six points behind full-time Prema driver Conrad Laursen, and finished fourth in the rookies' championship with four wins in the category.

2022 
In 2022, the Italian remained with Prema to contest the Italian F4 series, partnering Charlie Wurz, Conrad Laursen and Ferrari Academy members James Wharton and Rafael Câmara. His season started out in disappointing fashion, as Antonelli was forced to retire from the season opener at Imola after a gearbox issue whilst in the lead with five laps left. He would receive front wing damage after clipping a kerb in Race 2 and was penalised for a collision with teammate Wharton in Race 3, demoting him from fourth to tenth. The following rounds however would bring success, with two victories at Misano, and triples at Spa-Francorchamps and Vallelunga. A further win in Spielberg and Monza respectively added to Antonelli's championship advantage, and he clinched the title by winning Race 1 at Mugello.

Formula 4 UAE Championship 
In preparation for his main campaign in 2022, Antonelli took part in part of the Formula 4 UAE Championship. He took third place in the trophy race held in support of the 2021 Abu Dhabi Grand Prix. In the main championship, he was originally set to only contest round three, but health issues for Rafael Câmara meant Antonelli replaced him in the season opener. There, Antonelli took three on-the-road victories in a row, but lost the last one due to a penalty. Accumulating a further podium finish in round 3, Antonelli ended up eighth in the standings despite missing over half of the season.

ADAC Formula 4 Championship 

In 2022, Antonelli raced in ADAC Formula 4 Championship in parallel with his Italian F4 programme. He took two victories in round 1 at Spa-Francorchamps before completely dominating round 2 at Hockenheim, where he took all possible wins, poles and fastest laps. At the third round in Zandvoort he took both pole positions and two fastest laps and took two wins in the first two races before missing out on a hat-trick of wins by 0.058 in the reverse grid Race 3 where teammate Conrad Laursen took the victory. Despite missing the penultimate event at the Lausitzring, the Italian took the championship with one race to spare, having taken victory in the first two races during a weather-affected final round at the Nürburgring.

Motorsport Games F4 Cup 
In October 2022, it was announced Antonelli would represent Team Italy in the F4 Cup discipline of the FIA Motorsport Games. He ended up winning the qualifying and main race respectively, despite racing with a broken left wrist, owing to a collision near the end of qualifying.

Formula Regional Middle East Championship 
Antonelli is due to race in the 2023 Formula Regional Middle East Championship with Mumbai Falcons Racing Limited before his main 2023 campaign.

Formula Regional European Championship 
Antonelli was confirmed to be moving into the Formula Regional European Championship, remaining with Prema for the 2023 season.

Formula One 
In 2019, Antonelli was announced by the Mercedes-AMG Petronas Formula 1 Team as part of the Mercedes Junior Team.

Personal life 
His father Marco is a former racing driver who is owner of the AKM Motorsport outfit that is racing in the Italian F4 Championship.

Karting record

Karting career summary

Complete CIK-FIA Karting European Championship results 
(key) (Races in bold indicate pole position) (Races in italics indicate fastest lap)

Racing record

Racing career summary 

* Season still in progress.

Complete Italian F4 Championship results 
(key) (Races in bold indicate pole position) (Races in italics indicate fastest lap)

Complete Formula 4 UAE Championship results 
(key) (Races in bold indicate pole position) (Races in italics indicate fastest lap)

Complete ADAC Formula 4 Championship results 
(key) (Races in bold indicate pole position) (Races in italics indicate fastest lap)

Complete FIA Motorsport Games results

Complete Formula Regional Middle East Championship results
(key) (Races in bold indicate pole position) (Races in italics indicate fastest lap)

* Season still in progress.

Complete Formula Regional European Championship results 
(key) (Races in bold indicate pole position) (Races in italics indicate fastest lap)

References

External links 
 

2006 births
Living people
Italian racing drivers
Italian F4 Championship drivers
Italian F4 champions
ADAC Formula 4 drivers
Prema Powerteam drivers
Karting World Championship drivers
Mercedes-AMG Motorsport drivers
FIA Motorsport Games drivers
Formula Regional European Championship drivers
People from Bologna
UAE F4 Championship drivers
Mumbai Falcons drivers
Formula Regional Middle East Championship drivers